Red Sulphur Springs is an unincorporated community in Monroe County, West Virginia, United States. It once boasted the Red Sulphur Springs Hotel. Red Sulphur Springs is located on West Virginia Route 12, close to Indian Creek.

History
Red Sulphur Springs was known as a watering place from 1800. The springs were purchased by Dr. William Burke of Richmond in 1830, who built a hotel to accommodate up to 350 guests. Among the notable guests to the springs were Chief Justice of the Supreme Court Roger Taney and Francis Scott Key. The resort was disrupted by the Civil War. Ownership passed to Levi Morton, who had been Vice-President of the United States under Benjamin Harrison. He expanded the hotel, but the resort eventually failed. It was sold during World War I and divided into parcels, and the buildings demolished.

References

Unincorporated communities in Monroe County, West Virginia
Spa towns in West Virginia
Unincorporated communities in West Virginia